Mind over Matter is the second studio album by the American alternative rock band Young the Giant. It was produced by Justin Meldal-Johnsen and released on January 21, 2014, by Fueled by Ramen. Promoted by the singles "It's About Time" and "Crystallized", the album received generally favorable reviews from music critics.

Promotion
The lead single from the album, "It's About Time", was released on October 28, 2013, with an accompanying music video. On December 10, 2013, it was followed by the release of the second single, "Crystallized", for which a music video had been released a day earlier.

The album could be streamed for free on iTunes from January 14, 2014, until its official release on January 21, 2014.

Critical reception

Mind over Matter received generally favorable reviews from music critics. At Metacritic, which assigns a normalized rating out of 100 to reviews from mainstream critics, the album received an average score of 67, based on 7 reviews, indicating "generally favorable" reviews.

Rating the album three stars out of five, Timothy Monger of AllMusic called the album "an able, straightforward modern indie rock record" and wrote that the band was at its best on some of the lighter songs on the album, such as "Firelight" and "Waves". However, he noted that "the type of mainstream guitar/synth rock Young the Giant pursue is littered with similar acts, making it tough to rise above the din. Comparisons to stadium-filling bands like Coldplay and Phoenix are not out of line, but there is a general lack of distinction to much of the music on Mind over Matter, suggesting that the band still hasn't discovered its defining characteristics."
 
Kristofer Lenzon for Consequence of Sound wrote that Mind over Matter "documents the metamorphosis of the band from indie darling who could to full-blown arena rock overlords". However, he noted that "all the gloss and shimmer doesn't add to the overall enjoyment of the album, but presents a wavering distraction from the content" and that at times Justin Meldal Johnson's heavy production seems to be trying to compete with the strength of lead singer Sameer Gadhia's vocals: "Virtuosic talents like Gadhia's often sound best when given room to breathe and expand, as on Young the Giants 'God Made Man' or Mind Over Matters 'Firelight', where a simple plucked guitar line and atmospheric tones serve as a platform, not competition for Gadhia. The result is the sweetest and most emotionally impactful song on the record. (...) On an album so choked with production, the simplest moment is its most affecting."

Track listing

Personnel

Young the Giant
Sameer Gadhia – lead and backing vocals, percussion, piano, organ, synthesizer, keyboards
Jacob Tilley – guitar, Mellotron, synthesizer
Eric Cannata – guitar, backing vocals
Payam Doostzadeh – bass guitar, synthesizer
François Comtois – drums, percussion, backing vocals

Additional musicians
Justin Meldal-Johnsen – acoustic guitar, percussion
Carlos de la Garza – percussion
Jessica Ramseier – vocals
Steven Aho – orchestration
Roger Joseph Manning, Jr. – conducting, string arrangements

Technical personnel
Justin Meldal-Johnsen – production, engineering, programming
Carlos de la Garza – engineering
David Schwerkolt – engineering
Mike Schuppan – engineering, engineering assistant
Dave Schwerkolt – engineering assistant
Rich Costey – mixing
Martin Cooke – mixing assistant
Nicolas Fournier – mixing assistant
Bo Hill – mixing assistant
Ted Jensen – mastering
Mark Obriski – art direction, design
Matt Wisniewski – collage, cover collage
David Vincent Wolf – photography

Charts

Singles

References

2014 albums
Young the Giant albums
Albums produced by Justin Meldal-Johnsen
Fueled by Ramen albums